No Place to Land is an album by New Zealand singer, Michael Murphy, and was released in 2004.

Track listing
"Music Without a Song"
"Coming Down"
"How Good Does It Feel"
"A Step From The Edge"
"Stop Asking Me"
"Fallen Angel"
"Forever"
"Another Day"
"Should I Stay or Should I Go"
"So Damn Beautiful"
"Don't Be Afraid"

Michael Murphy (singer) albums
2004 albums